The FIS Nordic World Ski Championships 1938 took place February 24–28, 1938 in Lahti, Finland. This was the Finnish city's second time hosting the championships after having done so in 1926.

Men's cross country

18 km 
February 25, 1938

187 of 188 skiers completed the event.

50 km 
February 27, 1938

62 of the 99 skiers completed the event.

4 × 10 km relay
February 28, 1938

Men's Nordic combined

Individual 
February 24, 1938

Men's ski jumping

Individual large hill 
February 27, 1938

Medal table

References
FIS 1938 Cross country results
FIS 1938 Nordic combined results
FIS 1938 Ski jumping results
Results from German Wikipedia
Hansen, Hermann & Sveen, Knut. (1996) VM på ski '97. Alt om ski-VM 1925-1997 Trondheim: Adresseavisens Forlag. p. 59. . 

FIS Nordic World Ski Championships
Nordic Skiing
1938 in Nordic combined
1938 in Finnish sport
February 1938 sports events
Nordic skiing competitions in Finland
Sports competitions in Lahti